The fourth season of The Kelly Clarkson Show began airing on September 12, 2022.

Notes
 During the tapings in early December, Clarkson tested positive for COVID-19 and had to quarantine and host from home. She also had guest hosts while quarantining. 
 "Have Yourself a Merry Little Christmas" in episode 62 was performed by guest Jewel, marking the first time that a Kellyoke performance does not feature Kelly Clarkson. However, Kelly already performed the song in episode 58 of the second season.

Episodes

References

External links
 

4
2022 American television seasons
2023 American television seasons